Harold Robinson "Harry" Humby (8 April 1879 – 23 February 1923) was a British sport shooter, who competed at the 1908, 1912 and 1920 Summer Olympics.

In the 1908 Olympics he won a gold medal in the team small-bore rifle event, silver medal in the stationary target small-bore rifle event and was eighth in the disappearing target small-bore rifle event. Four years later he won a silver medal in the team clay pigeons event and was fourth in individual trap event.

References

External links
profile

1879 births
1923 deaths
British male sport shooters
ISSF rifle shooters
Trap and double trap shooters
Olympic shooters of Great Britain
Shooters at the 1908 Summer Olympics
Shooters at the 1912 Summer Olympics
Shooters at the 1920 Summer Olympics
Olympic gold medallists for Great Britain
Olympic silver medallists for Great Britain
Olympic medalists in shooting
Medalists at the 1908 Summer Olympics
Medalists at the 1912 Summer Olympics
20th-century British people